Theos (from the , theos, "God") is a religion and society think tank based in the United Kingdom which exists to undertake research and provide commentary on social and political arrangements. Theos aims to impact opinion around issues of faith and belief in society through research, publications, media engagement and events.  Theos was launched in November 2006 with the support of the then Archbishop of Canterbury, Rowan Williams, and the then Archbishop of Westminster, Cardinal Cormac Murphy O'Connor, and maintains an ecumenical position. Theos is based in central London.

Nick Spencer, Research Director at Theos has published multiple books, including The Evolution of the West: How Christianity Shaped Our Values and Atheists: The Origin of the Species. His most recent book is The Political Samaritan: How Power Hijacked a Parable.

References

External links

Joint Committee takes evidence from Archbishop of Canterbury, Theos and the BHA on draft Lords Reform Bill, November 2011
 The Bible makes sense read as stories, The Times, September 2011, Elizabeth Hunter
 The Political Bible: Part 1, The Guardian, August 2011, Nick Spencer
 Is common ground between atheism and belief possible? Julian Baggini, The Guardian, 25 November 2011

Christian political organizations
Faith and theology think tanks based in the United Kingdom